Matthew Wade Osborne (July 27, 1957 – June 28, 2013), known professionally as Matt Borne, was an American professional wrestler. Osborne was a second generation wrestler, the son of Tony Borne, and is best known as being the first wrestler to portray the character of Doink the Clown.

Professional wrestling career

National Wrestling Alliance (1978–1984)
Under the ring name Matt Borne, Osborne debuted on December 6, 1978 and wrestled for various National Wrestling Alliance territories, most prominently for Pacific Northwest Wrestling, where he was their heavyweight and four-time tag champion. Borne also would regularly referee matches while in Portland as that territory had only one primary referee (Sandy Barr) and it was not uncommon for wrestlers there to ref when not working a match: his officiating indeed became part of several major angles. In Mid Atlantic Championship Wrestling on June 6, 1980, he won his first championship, also the first of two tag titles he would hold with Buzz Sawyer. In Mid-South Wrestling, he allied with Ted DiBiase and Jim Duggan as a member of The Rat Pack, a heel stable, and won their tag title with DiBiase. In Canada, he worked for All Star Wrestling and Maple Leaf Wrestling.

World Wrestling Federation (1985–1986)
Borne debuted in the WWF on March 2, 1985, wrestling Rick McGraw to a time-limit draw in the Boston Garden. This was followed four days later by another draw, this time to eventual WWF Champion Bret Hart in Elizabeth, NJ. Two days later Borne suffered his first recorded defeat, losing to David Sammartino in Hershey, PA. 

He was primarily a jobber, though occasionally beat other jobbers at house shows. He made his television debut for the WWF on March 23, 1985 edition of All Star Wrestling, teaming with Frank Marconi in a losing effort against WWF Tag-Team Champions Mike Rotundo and Barry Windham. Throughout the year Borne would face a variety of opponents on television and at live events, and the highlight of this stint was losing to Ricky "The Dragon" Steamboat at the first WrestleMania in Madison Square Garden. His last match was a loss to George Wells in the Cow Palace on April 29, 1986.

World Class Championship Wrestling (1986–1989)
In May 1986, Borne joined World Class Championship Wrestling. That September, he reformed his tag team with Buzz Sawyer under the management of Percival Pringle III to win a one-day tournament to crown new World Tag Team Champions. He also won the Texas Heavyweight Championship and defended the title at the Christmas Star Wars event against The Iron Sheik. Borne and Sawyer feuded with fellow Pringle protege Dingo Warrior after falling out with him during a six-man tag match, with Warrior turning babyface as a direct result of the incident.

United States Wrestling Association (1989–1991)
In 1989, World Class merged with United States Wrestling Association based in Memphis, Tennessee. He and Jeff Jarrett won the USWA Southern Tag Team Titles defeating Cactus Jack and Scott Braddock. On May 25, 1990 he defeated Kerry Von Erich for the USWA Texas Heavyweight Title and dropped the title back to Von Erich on June 1. He left USWA in 1991.

World Championship Wrestling (1991–1992)
In 1991, Osborne signed with World Championship Wrestling and debuted as "Big Josh", an outdoorsman who danced with bears and was friends with Tommy Rich. He debuted as a fan who would run in from the crowd with an axe handle to save babyfaces from villainous attacks by heels. During his stint with WCW, Osborne won the United States Tag Team Championship with Ron Simmons and the World Six-Man Tag Team Championship with Dustin Rhodes and Tom Zenk. Borne made his final pay-per-view appearance for the company on May 17, 1992 at WrestleWar, where he defeated Richard Morton; and continued to make sporadic WCW TV appearances throughout the summer of 1992 before leaving the company.

World Wrestling Federation (1992–1993)

After leaving WCW in 1992, Osborne returned to the World Wrestling Federation on September 21, 1992 in Manitoba, Canada at a WWF Superstars taping. Competing as himself, he defeated Bill Jordan. Borne would shortly thereafter become Doink the Clown, in a villainous clown gimmick that would frequently pull tricks on wrestlers at ringside as well as fans. He made his in ring televised debut on the January 31, 1993 edition of Wrestling Challenge defeating Bob East. He would also briefly use the character in United States Wrestling Association in February before returning to WWF television in March. Soon after his televised return, he began feuding with Crush after attacking him with a prosthetic arm on an episode of Superstars of Wrestling, which subsequently resulted in a match at WrestleMania IX. During this match, another Doink (Steve Keirn) came out from under the ring and attacked Crush with another prosthetic arm, allowing the real Doink to pin Crush.

In the spring of 1993, Doink was given the opportunity to enter the King of the Ring tournament, facing Mr. Perfect in the qualifying round. After two time-limit draws, Mr. Perfect defeated Doink in their third match. At the Pay Per View itself, Doink (or rather, two Doinks) distracted Crush causing him to lose to Intercontinental Champion Shawn Michaels. Doink spent the summer months of 1993 continuing his feud with Crush as well as successful house show runs against Marty Jannetty and the 1-2-3 Kid, as well as occasionally losing to higher profile opponents like Bret Hart or Tatanka. At SummerSlam, Jerry Lawler hired Doink to wrestle Hart as he feigned injury, which "the Hitman" won by disqualification when Lawler interfered. Several days later, Doink turned against Lawler, by inciting a mocking chant from the fans directed at him.

On the September 13, 1993 Raw, Doink poured a pail of water over Bobby Heenan, marking his fan favorite turn. On a December episode of Raw, Doink was given a present from Santa Claus in the form of a midget in the Doink costume, which he named Dink. Shortly afterward, however, Osborne was fired for re-occurring drug abuses. His final TV appearance in the WWF for that era was on the December 27, 1993 episode of Raw. Osborne cited in a shoot interview that Bam Bam Bigelow did not like putting over Osborne. Osborne said this subsequently led to Bigelow snitching on him for smoking weed in the hallway of his hotel and getting him fired from the WWF. Following his departure, Doink was played by Ray Licameli (also known as Ray Apollo).

Extreme Championship Wrestling (1994)
Following his departure from the WWF, Borne appeared in Extreme Championship Wrestling for a handful of matches as Doink. However, the fans hated this, as ECW was viewed as an alternative to the WWF and WCW and seeing a gimmick like this made Doink a villain for a completely different reason.

After Doink lost a match to then-World Heavyweight Champion Shane Douglas, Douglas went on to criticize Vince McMahon for turning a talented wrestler like Borne into a comic relief character, and claimed that he knew how to bring out Borne's full potential. Borne then changed his ring name to Borne Again, and continued wearing the clown suit, albeit without the wig, wearing a minimal amount of face paint, as well as growing out his hair and beard. After beating his opponents, he would make them dress in clown outfits. However, his tenure with the company was short-lived due to personal problems.

Late career (1994–2013)
After leaving ECW, Osborne wrestled on the independent circuit, for several reunion shows and for various independent promotions under his Matt Borne ring name. In 2005, at WrestleReunion II Borne participated in an eight-man tag team match alongside Andrew Martin, Steve Corino and The Masked Superstar. However, his team lost to Dusty Rhodes, The Blue Meanie, Tom Prichard and D'Lo Brown. On December 10, 2007, Osborne reprised the role of Doink at Raw's 15th Anniversary as he took part in a Legends Battle Royal. In early 2010, Osborne reinvented the Doink character to resemble Heath Ledger's portrayal of The Joker in The Dark Knight, nicknaming the incarnation 'Reborne Again'. The new character debuted on March 27 for ISPW in New Jersey. On May 23, 2010 Doink the Clown, portrayed by Dusty Wolfe, interfered against Skandor Akbar and his men Dr. Knuckles and Rommel. This caused them to lose the Wrecking Ball Wrestling tag titles. In retaliation Akbar called on the original Doink (Matt Borne). They were scheduled to meet on August 15, 2010. At that time Wolfe no-showed the event to avoid the wrath of Borne. On August 8, 2010, Borne won the Wrecking Ball Wrestling Championship.
After this, Osborne returned to a full-time schedule, continuing to compete on a semi-regular basis all over the United States for the last several years until a few days before his death on June 28, 2013.

Death
Osborne was found dead on June 28, 2013, in the Plano, Texas apartment he lived in. He was 55 years old. Though no weapons were found near his body, and police said the death appeared accidental, they launched a precautionary homicide investigation. The cause of death was later determined to be an accidental overdose of morphine and hydrocodone. He also suffered from heart disease, which had been a contributing factor in his death.

In June 2015, a wrongful death lawsuit was filed against WWE, alleging that "WWE created a culture of violence and sacrificed Matt Osborne's brain for its own profit" which "led to further illnesses and injuries, including depression and drug abuse, which ultimately resulted in his untimely death."  WWE attorney Jerry McDevitt said the suit was without merit and blamed the attorneys for taking advantage of the families involved. The suit was filed by the mother of two of Osborne's four children, and was litigated by attorney Konstantine Kyros, who has been involved in a number of other lawsuits against WWE. The lawsuit was dismissed by US District Judge Vanessa Lynne Bryant, who ruled that they failed to show that his death was linked to chronic traumatic encephalopathy.

Other media

Matt Osborne (as Doink) appeared in WWF WrestleMania: The Arcade Game and several versions of the video game WWE Raw. Osborne's "Evil Doink" persona also appeared in WWE 2K22 in 2022, as DLC.

Championships and accomplishments
International Wrestling Association
IWA United States Heavyweight Championship (1 time)
Mid-Atlantic Championship Wrestling / World Championship Wrestling
NWA Mid-Atlantic Tag Team Championship (1 time) – with Buzz Sawyer
WCW United States Tag Team Championship (1 time) – with Ron Simmons
WCW World Six-Man Tag Team Championship (1 time) – with Dustin Rhodes and Tom Zenk
Mid-South Wrestling Association
Mid-South Tag Team Championship (1 time) – with Ted DiBiase
New England Pro Wrestling Hall of Fame
Class of 2014
Pacific Northwest Wrestling / Championship Wrestling USA
Championship Wrestling International Alliance World Heavyweight Championship (1 time)
Championship Wrestling USA Television Championship (1 time)
NWA Pacific Northwest Heavyweight Championship (1 time)
NWA Pacific Northwest Tag Team Championship (4 times) – with Steve Regal (2) and Rip Oliver (2)
Portland Wrestling
Portland Pacific Northwest Tag Team Championship (1 time) – with Brian Cox
Pro Wrestling Illustrated
PWI ranked him #26 of the top 500 singles wrestlers in the PWI 500 in 1992
PWI ranked him #398 of the 500 best singles wrestlers during the PWI Years in 2003.
Ring Around The Northwest Newsletter
Wrestler of the Year (1996)
Tag Team of the Year (1997) with Bruiser Brian
Texas Wrestling Federation
TWF Heavyweight Championship (1 time)
Texas Wrestling Hall of Fame
Class of 2011
Ultimate Wrestling
UW Phantom Championship (1 time) 
United States Wrestling League
USWL Unified World Heavyweight Championship (1 time)
World Class Wrestling Association
USWA World Tag Team Championship (2 times) – with Jeff Jarrett
WCWA Texas Heavyweight Championship (2 times)
WCWA World Tag Team Championship (2 times) – with Buzz Sawyer (1) and Jeff Jarrett (1)<
Wrecking Ball Wrestling
WBW Championship (1 time)
WBW Tag Team Championship (1 time) – with Lumberjack Tony Martin
Comeback of the Year (2011)
Superstar of the Year (2012)

References

External links 
 

1957 births
2013 deaths
20th-century professional wrestlers
21st-century professional wrestlers
American clowns
American male professional wrestlers
Drug-related deaths in Texas
Fictional clowns
Professional wrestlers from North Carolina
Sportspeople from Charlotte, North Carolina
USWA World Tag Team Champions
NWA/WCW United States Tag Team Champions